Nouakchott International Airport  was an airport located in Nouakchott, the capital of Mauritania. Until late 2010, the airport served as hub of Mauritania Airways. Mauritania Airlines International was based at the airport until the closure.

Accidents and incidents
On August 26, 2010, an Astraeus Boeing 757-200 registered G-STRY (operating for BMI) carrying 108 passengers was forced to land at the airport after experiencing vibrations in both it's engines. The plane was flying from Freetown to London when its pilot chose to divert to Nouakchott. There were no casualties. The final report said that the cause of the incident was icing. 
On 12 July 2012, a Harbin Y-12 aircraft belonging to the military crashed while attempting to take off from Nouakchott International Airport, killing all seven people on board. The plane had been chartered by Canadian gold miner Kinross Gold to carry gold from its Tasiast Gold Mine. The cause was not immediately known, but witnesses said the aircraft caught fire before it went down.

References

External links

 
 

Defunct airports in Mauritania
Nouakchott
Airports disestablished in 2016
2016 disestablishments in Africa